The Port of Valencia is a seaport in Valencia, Spain. It is the fifth busiest seaport in Europe and the busiest port in the Mediterranean.

The port is also an important employer in the area, with more than 15,000 employees who provide services to more than 7,500 ships every year.

History 
The history of the Port of Valencia began in 1483, when King Ferdinand the Catholic granted Antoni Joan the privilege of building a wooden bridge on the beach of the Grao district, called the Pont de Fusta.

From 1483 until the 19th century, various construction projects were built in the port, but because of periodic flooding of the Turia River and the continual movements of sand on the beach the port was not notably successful. However, traffic did increase incrementally over time and the king eventually granted trading privileges with other kingdoms and sovereign states in 1679 and for the Americas in 1791, with Valencia becoming the sixth maritime province in Spain.

Description 
The three ports controlled by the Port Authority of Valencia are in Valencia, Sagunto and Gandía. They are located on the shores of the Mediterranean Sea, along an 80 km stretch of Spain’s eastern coastline.

The Port of Valencia is the centre of economic activity in an area of influence encompassing a radius of 350 km.

Valencia Port Authority (PAV) has announced plans for the construction of a new container terminal in the northern expansion by 2030.

Satellite ports

Port of Sagunto 
This port has an annual traffic capacity of 10% of the entire port – its main cargo is liquefied natural gas; three million tonnes of gas are shipped per year due to the regasification plant located nearby.

Around 70% of the port's current traffic consists of iron and steel products and the rest of fertilizers, construction materials, timber and perishable products.

Port of Gandía 
This port has an annual traffic capacity of 1.5 % of the entire port, and specialises in the export and import of forestry products: timber, reels, pulp, paper and furniture.

Statistics 
In 2007 the Port of Valencia handled 53,592,859 tonnes of cargo and 3,042,665 TEU making it the second busiest cargo port in Spain and the largest container port in the country.

* figures in tonnes

See also 
 List of ports in Spain
 List of busiest ports in Europe
 List of world's busiest container ports
 Valencia Street Circuit

References

External links

 Official website 

Valencia
Buildings and structures in Valencia
Transport in Valencia
Economy of Valencia